The Petroleum Authority of Uganda (PAOU), also known as the Uganda National Petroleum Authority, is governmental organisation that regulates the petroleum industry in Uganda, the third-largest economy in the East African Community. Its responsibilities include licensing, regulation, supervision of exploration, harvesting, refining, marketing, and disposal of petroleum products in the country. Although owned by the Ugandan government, it is expected to act independently.

Overview
The law authorising the creation of PAOU is known as the Petroleum (Exploration, Development and Production) Act 2013. It was passed by the Ugandan parliament on 7 December 2012 and was assented to by the president of Uganda on 12 March 2013. The law was gazetted on 15 April 2013. PAOU was established once the president named its board of directors and once Uganda's parliament approved the board members. In August 2017, PAOU advertised 37 mainly managerial positions, in preparation for first oil, at that time expected in 2020.

Location
The headquarters of PAOU is at 34-36 Lugard Avenue, in Entebbe, on the northern shores of Lake Victoria. The coordinates of the headquarters of the authority are:0°03'15.0"N, 32°28'52.0"E (Latitude:0.054167; Longitude:32.481111).

Governance
The chairperson of the board is Jane Mulemwa, a Ugandan chemist and academic. Other members of the board are Bernard Ongodia, Kevin Aanyu, Noble Banadda, Lynda Biribonwa, Doreen Kabasindi Wandera and Kiryowa Kiwanuka. In June 2016, Ernest Rubondo was appointed as executive director and chief executive officer of PAOU.

Having served the prescribed four years, the first board was disbanded and a new board was appointed and sworn in, in 2020.

Other considerations
In January 2019, the Cabinet of Uganda made a decision "to formally join the Extractive Industries Transparency Initiative (EITI) as a member state". According to the government spokesperson, the decision was intended "to enhance the revenue collection process, boost finances and minimize mismanagement of oil and gas revenue".

See also

 Uganda Oil Refinery
 Economy of Uganda
 Uganda National Oil Company
 Uganda–Kenya Crude Oil Pipeline
 Kenya-Uganda-Rwanda Petroleum Products Pipeline
Energy Regulators Association of East Africa

References

External links
Uganda’s Oil Has Not Been Sold ‑ Government As of 13 November 2019.
  UShs50m Per Month for Oil Authority Boss
Dr. Jane N. Mulemwa - Deputy Chairperson, Education Service Commission
Invest energy resources in development capacity - Museveni As of 24 October 2015.

Petroleum in Uganda
Regulatory agencies of Uganda
Wakiso District
Government agencies established in 2014
2014 establishments in Uganda
Petroleum organizations
Energy regulatory authorities